White Mosque may refer to:

 White Mosque, Berat, a ruined building in Albania
 White Mosque, Nazareth, a 19th-century mosque in Nazareth
 White Mosque, Ramla, an 8th-century mosque in Ramla
 Abidin Mosque, in Kuala Terengganu, Malaysia
 Jezzar Pasha Mosque (White Mosque of Acre), an 18th-century mosque in Acre
 Nurulla Mosque, in Kazan, Russia
 Šerefudin's White Mosque, a 15th-century mosque in Visoko, Bosnia and Herzegovina
 Al-Aqsa Library's former name

See also 
 Ak-Mechet (disambiguation)